The Church of St Paraskeva (tsarkva "Sveta Paraskeva") is a Bulgarian Orthodox church in Sofia, the capital of Bulgaria. The church, dedicated to Saint Paraskeva, is located on 58 Georgi Rakovski Street in the centre of the city. It is the third-largest church in Sofia.

Plans to build a church at the site date to 1910, when Stuttgart-educated Bulgarian architect Anton Tornyov (1868–1942) won a competition for the church's design. Due to the Balkan Wars and World War I, however, the construction was postponed. In 1922, the church board of trustees announced another competition, which was again won by Tornyov. The construction of the Church of St Paraskeva was complete by 1930, but the finishing works on the porticos did not cease until 1940.

St Paraskeva has a somewhat unusual design for an Eastern Orthodox church. The cella gradually disintegrates into the surrounding apses.

See also
List of churches in Sofia

References

Paraskeva
Churches completed in 1930
Church buildings with domes